Nankana Sahib District is a district in the Punjab province of Pakistan. Nankana Sahib is the seat of the district government, and Shahkot is the largest urban center. Until 2005, it was part of Sheikhupura District.

Administration 
The district is administratively subdivided into three tehsils.

Demographics 
At the time of the 2017 census, the district's population was 1,354,986, of which 690,274 were males and 664,558 females. 1,109,862 were rural and 245,124 urban. The literacy rate was 63.71%. Muslims were the predominant religious community with 96.68% of the population while Christians were 2.97% of the population.

At the time of the 2017 census, 98.83% of the population spoke Punjabi as their first language.

Education 
District Nankana Sahib is ranked at the 26th position in the education score index of the Pakistan District Education Rankings 2017 published by Alif Ailaan. The education score is composed of the learning score, retention score and gender parity score.

In the middle school infrastructure score index, which focuses on availability of basic facilities and the building condition of schools, Nankana Sahib ranks 51st. The facilities of electricity and drinking water in schools remain very good in the district with a 100% score. However, the building conditions are below average with a score of 45.07.

On the TaleemDo! App, majority residents of several areas within Nankana Sahib have complained about shortage of teachers available for schools and there is no access of transport available to schools located at larger distances. This issue is reported by a majority of female students.

District development
The possibility of the development of a university, named after Guru Nanak, has been raised.

The Punjab government decided to link Nankana Sahib District with the provincial capital, Lahore. With these plans the Punjab government is completing "Khanqah Dogran Interchange" (on the M-2) very swiftly, which is a helpful project to develop the newly created District of Nankana Sahib. This will also give access to the Grand Trunk Road, which leads to the Indian Punjab from the Wagah border. Nankana Sahib-Amritsar bus was inaugurated by Ex-Prime Minister of India Manmohan Singh.

References

 
Districts of Punjab, Pakistan
2005 establishments in Pakistan
Memorials to Guru Nanak
Guru Nanak Dev
Sikhism in Pakistan